Giuseppe "Oscar" Damiani (born 15 June 1950) is an Italian former professional football winger. He is currently the agent of FC Barcelona striker Pierre-Emerick Aubameyang.

Honours

Club 
Juventus
Serie A: 1974–75
A.C. Milan
Serie B: 1982–83

Individual honours 
1980
Top scorer of the Coppa Italia: 6 goals

External links 
Profile at MagliaRossonera.it 
Profile at EmozioneCalcio.it 
International caps at FIGC.it 

1950 births
Living people
Italian footballers
Italy under-21 international footballers
Italy international footballers
Italian expatriate footballers
Association football forwards
Serie A players
Serie B players
North American Soccer League (1968–1984) players
L.R. Vicenza players
S.S.C. Napoli players
Juventus F.C. players
Genoa C.F.C. players
A.C. Milan players
New York Cosmos players
Inter Milan players
Parma Calcio 1913 players
S.S. Lazio players
Expatriate soccer players in the United States